Earl Park Lake is a lake located in Apache County on the White Mountains Apache Indian Reservation in the White Mountains of Arizona. Fish varieties found include brook, rainbow, brown, and cutthroat trout.

As of 2008, the lake is restricted to flyfishing.  Regulations require artificial lures and catch and release fishing.

References 

Reservoirs in Arizona
Lakes of Apache County, Arizona